RGC100 is an immune stimulant drug.  It has a molecular weight of 64.9 KDa that activated dendritic cells of the human immune system.  It specifically targets endosomal TLR3 with good solubility and serum stability.

References

Immunostimulants
TLR3 agonist